Lončari is a village in the municipalities of Teslić (Republika Srpska), Usora and Tešanj, Bosnia and Herzegovina.

Demographics 
According to the 2013 census, its population was 158, with 138 living in the Tešanj part, 4 (all Croats) living in the Usora part and 16 living in the Teslić part.

References

Populated places in Tešanj
Populated places in Usora
Populated places in Teslić